Chiabaleh Pain (also Romanized as Chīābaleh Pā’īn) is a village in Kuhdasht-e Shomali Rural District, in the Central District of Kuhdasht County, Lorestan Province, Iran. At the 2006 census, its population was 59, in 11 families.

References 

Towns and villages in Kuhdasht County